Michel Plante (born January 19, 1952) is a Canadian former professional ice hockey player who played in the World Hockey Association (WHA). Drafted in the fifth round of the 1972 NHL Amateur Draft by the Toronto Maple Leafs, Plante opted to play in the WHA after being selected by the Miami Screaming Eagles in the WHA General Player Draft. He played parts of two seasons for the Blazers franchise — which had moved from Miami before their inaugural season — in Philadelphia and Vancouver.

As a youth, he played in the 1964 Quebec International Pee-Wee Hockey Tournament with a minor ice hockey team from Drummondville.

Career statistics

References

External links

1952 births
Canadian ice hockey left wingers
Drummondville Rangers players
Ice hockey people from Quebec
Living people
Philadelphia Blazers players
Philadelphia Firebirds (NAHL) players
Port Huron Flags (IHL) players
Roanoke Valley Rebels (SHL) players
Sportspeople from Drummondville
Toronto Maple Leafs draft picks
Vancouver Blazers players